Ratainda or Ratenda  is a large village in Shaheed Bhagat Singh Nagar district of Punjab State, India. The village is administrated by a Sarpanch, who is the elected representative of the village.

Caste 
The village has a mixed population which includes, but is not limited to, Backward Class (BC), Scheduled Caste (SC) and Farmer. The village doesn't have any Scheduled Tribe (ST) population.

Education 
The village has a Punjabi medium, co-educational upper primary with secondary/higher secondary (GSSS Ratainda School) which was established in 1966. The school has a playground, library and also provides mid-day meal as per Indian Midday Meal Scheme, and the meal is prepared on school premises.

Religious places
There are three gurudwaras in the village and a Hindu temple.

Transport

Rail 

Air 

Notable people 
Baljit Singh Gosal a Canadian politician, who was elected to the House of Commons of Canada in the 2011 election, was born in Ratainda.

 Dhadhi Didaar Singh was the famous sirangi master in the whole Punjab from village Ratainda. There is a statue of Dhadhi Didaar Singh in the village.

References 

Cities and towns in Shaheed Bhagat Singh Nagar district